Call It Watcha Like is the third studio album by freestyle singer Johnny O, released on September 5, 1995, by record label ex-It Records.

From that album came out four singles, the first single, "Runaway Love", the song that made it big on the charts, and the second song released by Johnny O to enter the Billboard Hot 100 (the other was "Dreamboy/Dreamgirl "partnered with Cynthia), at position 87. None of the subsequent singles achieved success.

The album failed to get into any music chart.

Tracks

Bonus Track - Edition of Germany

Charts
Singles

References

1995 albums
Johnny O albums